Sohagi Union is a union parishad under Ishwarganj Upazila of Mymensingh District in the division of Mymensingh, Bangladesh.

Geography 
Sohagi Union is bounded on the east and north by Gouripur Upazila, on the west by Ishwarganj Union and on the south by Jatia and Sarisha Unions.

Demographics 
According to the National Bureau of Statistics of Bangladesh census report, the number of men and women in the union was 12,525 and 12,136 respectively in 2001.

References 

Unions of Ishwarganj Upazila